Cannon and Ball's Playhouse is a sitcom featuring Cannon and Ball.  Originally intended to be 6 episodes, only 2 ended up being made as ITV favoured Plaza Patrol.

Cast

Tommy Cannon  ...  Tommy Davenport
Bobby Ball  ...  Bobby Barnes
Sherrie Hewson  ...  Beryl Davenport
Keith Marsh  ...  Alf
Janet Rawson  ...  Julia
Paula Ann Bland  ...  Heather
Siobhan Finneran  ...  Carol

References

External links

1990 British television series debuts
1990 British television series endings
1990s British sitcoms
Television series by Yorkshire Television